Akpes (Àbèsàbèsì) is an endangered language of Nigeria. It is spoken by approximately 7,000 speakers in the North of Ondo State. The language is surrounded by several other languages of the Akoko area, where Yoruba is the lingua franca. Yoruba replaces Akpes in more and more informal domains and thus forwards a gradual shift from Akpes towards Yoruba. Akpes is generally attributed to the Volta-Congo Branch of the Niger-Congo phylum.

Name

The language is commonly referred to as 'Akpes' in literature. As this term is in fact the name of one of the four dialects, it is not supported by the whole speaker community. A meeting of representatives of all nine settlements has coined the term 'Abesabesi' to denote the language. It is a reduplication of the word àbès meaning 'we'.

Distribution and varieties

Abesabesi is spoken in nine different settlements in the Akoko North East and Akoko North West LGAs of Ondo State. While Àkùnnù, Àsẹ̀, Gèdègédé, Ìbáràmù, Ìkáràmù, and Ìyànì are independent towns, three settlements form a quarter of the multilingual town Àjọwá: Dája, Ẹ̀ṣùkù, Ìlúdọ̀tun (also: Ìlọ̀dùn or Àkùnnù Àjọwá). The quarter Efifa of Ajowa used to speak Akpes in the past but switched to the local Yoruba variety Owe. Agoyi (2009) classifies the varieties of these nine settlements into four dialects: Akpes, Èkiròmì, Èṣùkù, Ìluẹnì. Her analysis is mostly based on differences in lexicon and phonemics (especially vowel harmony). All dialects are mutually intelligible.  Below is a table of all dialects, the settlements they are spoken in, and alternate names.

Genetic affiliation
While most scholars attribute Abesabesi somewhere in the Volta-Niger branch of Niger-Congo, its exact position within this branch is disputed. Some claimed that it forms a separate sub-branch and others claimed a closer relationship to the Edoid languages or Ukaan. 

The ASJP 4.0 classifies Abesabesi as most closely related to the Ukaan language.

Phonology
Abesabesi has a rich phoneme inventory comprising labial-velar and labialized consonants and an advanced tongue root (ATR) distinction for the oral mid vowels. The orthography used here follows Lau (2020), which is based on IPA.
Abesabesi is a tonal language with a high, a mid, and a low tone. These tones are symbolized through an acute accent, no accent, or grave accent on the tone-bearing unit. All three tones are lexical tones. However, the high tone only rarely appears on base lexemes but is often used as grammatical tone marking the mood of a clause, possession, location, or relativization. Frequent phonological processes in Abesabesi include vowel deletion, assimilation, and vowel harmony. A syllable can have the structure N (syllabic nasal) or (C)V(V)(C). Closed syllables only appear at the end of a word and are likely to have resulted from word final vowel deletion.

Vowels
Abesabesi exhibits seven oral and five nasal vowels. While an ATR distinction exists for the oral mid vowels (/o/ vs. /ɔ/ and /e/ vs. /ɛ/), nasal vowels do not differentiate +ATR from -ATR (/ɔ̃/ and /ɛ̃/).

Consonants
Abesabesi's consonant inventory consists of 29 consonants. While 20 of these consonants are frequently used in lexemes, nine only appear marginally (indicated in parentheses). Many of these marginal consonants are labialized equivalents of stops, nasals, and fricatives, such as //, //, and //. Agoyi treats these consonants as a result of deleted rounded vowels. 
The phoneme /ʃ/ can be realized as [ʃ] or as the affricate [t͜ʃ].

See also
Akpes word lists (Wiktionary)

Further reading
Agoyi, Taiwo Ọpeyemi 1997. The category of number and the genetic classification of Èkiròmì. Seminar paper, University of Ilorin.
Ayoọla O.J. 1986. Aspects of the Phonology of Dája. BA long essay, University of Ilorin.
Blench, Roger. 2011. Comparative Akpes.
Ibrahim-Arirabiyi, Femi 1989. A comparative reconstruction of Akpes lects. MA thesis, Department of Linguistics and Nigerian Languages, University of Port Harcourt.
Lau, Jonas 2021. A Digital Reference Grammar of Abesabesi. Towards a data format for digital reference grammars. Doctoral Thesis, University of Cologne 
Raji, B.T. 1986. Aspects of the phonology of Ikaramu. BA long essay, University of Ilorin.

References

External links
 Abesabesi language blog
 Collection Àbèsàbèsì - ELAR, SOAS, University of London
 Abesabesi language documentation and maintenance
 Akpes basic lexicon at the Global Lexicostatistical Database

Volta–Niger languages